Claes Henning Roxin (born December 17, 1951) is a Swedish curler.

Awards
In 1988 he was inducted into the Swedish Curling Hall of Fame.

Teams

Men's

Mixed

Personal life
His three brothers – Göran (twin brother), Björn and Lars-Eric – are also curlers.

References

External links
 

Living people
1951 births
Swedish male curlers
Swedish curling champions
Swedish twins
Twin sportspeople
20th-century Swedish people